Miceli's is the oldest Italian restaurant in Hollywood, California.

Miceli's started in Hollywood in 1949 and later expanded to several additional locations. Both the original Hollywood location and a newer store in Universal City that opened in 1980 are known for dark, sprawling, colorful interiors, ceilings lined with hanging Chianti bottles, and singing servers. The wooden booths, stools, and wall panels were removed from the nearby Pig 'n Whistle after it went defunct in 1952. 

The restaurant was founded by World War II (WWII) veteran Carmen Miceli. Miceli continued to visit the restaurant and share stories with guests, including many celebrities and three U.S. presidents. Miceli died at the age of 92 in 2015. He was the son of Sicilian immigrants and was born in Chicago on March 17, 1923. Miceli moved to Los Angeles in 1946 and worked as a waiter at Ciro's before he brought his family to California to join him in opening their first restaurant. Miceli's Hollywood pizzeria attracted many famous Italian Americans, including Frank Sinatra, Dean Martin, Joe DiMaggio, and his wife Marilyn Monroe.

References

 
 

Restaurants in Los Angeles
Italian restaurants in California
Restaurants established in 1949
Companies based in Los Angeles County, California